Najim Arshad  (born 8 June 1986) is a state award-winning Indian playback singer and music director, sung  more than 500 songs in the Malayalam, Tamil, Telugu and Hindi film industries. In 2007, he won the reality show Idea Star Singer. He studied in Swathi Thirunal College of Music and holds graduation and post-graduation degree in music. He was the Rank Holder of University of Kerala in Bachelor Of Performing Arts. He also won the Kalaprathibha title 13 times at the district and sub-district levels during his early school days. He is a recipient of Kerala State Film Award for Best Male Playback Singer.

Personal life

Najim was born to Shahul Hameed (Thirumala Shahul) and Rehma. His father retired from his position as an administrative officer of the Central Vigilance Commission and his mother is a music teacher. He has two elder brothers, Dr. Ajim Shad and Sajim who works as a sound engineer. On 13 September 2015, he married Thazni Thaha (Kiki) in Punalur

Career

Najim debuted as a playback singer in 2007, with the song "Mizhineer" in Major Ravi's Malayalam film Mission 90 Days.  Arshad first gained attention through his album, I'm Here. Najim sang a ghazal for the movie Khaafiron ki Namaaz. He also sang in Casanovva, Doctor Love, and Diamond Necklace. Arshad rose to the top of the music charts in 2012 with the songs Diamond Necklace, Trivandrum Lodge, Ayalum Njanum Thammil and Da Thadiya. He's known for his collaboration with almost all the music composers in the Malayalam film industry. He debuted as a music director by composing two Hindi songs in the Mohanlal film 1971 Beyond Borders. The war drama that sheds light onto the Indo-Pak war of 1971, is a multi-lingual film which was also released in Tamil, Telugu and Hindi. Najim has composed the songs Armaan Hazare (singer: Hariharan) and Sarhade (singer: Najim Arshad), that come towards the end portion of the movie.

Discography

Music Director

Albums

Awards
 2022 : Gandhi Bhavan Award - Best Singer 
 2020 : Kerala State Film Award for Best Male Playback Singer 
 2016 : Indywood Excellence Award ||Popular Singer 
 2015 : Ramu Karyattu Award || Best Male Singer
 2015 : Mangalam Publications Film Awards || Best Male singer
 2015 : EFA Award || Voice of the year 
 2014 : Asiavision Awards || Sensational Singer 
 2014 : Cera Big Malayalam music awards (92.7 BIG FM)
 2013 : Amrita TV Film Awards || Best Male Singer 
 2013 : Mollywood Nakshathra Best Male Singer
 2013 : Gulf Malayalam Music Award
 2013 : Lions Club Best Singer Awards 2013
 2013 : Kerala Film Critics Association Awards – Best Male Singer – Drishyam, Emmanuel
 2013 : Thikkurushi Foundation award best male singer
 2008 : Vayyankara Madhusoodanan Award

References

External links
Official Website
Official Blog
Official YouTube Channel
Official Facebook Page

1986 births
Living people
Indian male playback singers
Malayalam playback singers
Singers from Thiruvananthapuram
Film musicians from Kerala
21st-century Indian singers
21st-century Indian male singers